Miclăuș is a Romanian surname. Notable people with the surname include:

Casian Miclăuș (born 1977), Romanian footballer
Petre Miclăuș (born 1939), Romanian gymnast

Romanian-language surnames